Lelita is a monotypic moth genus of the family Oecophoridae. Its only species, Lelita acmaea, is found in Chile. Both the genus and species were described by John Frederick Gates Clarke in 1978.

The wingspan is about 12.5 mm. The forewings are blackish fuscous with at the apex a triangular, ochraceous-orange patch. The base of the triangle is edged with black scales. The hindwings are fuscous.

References

Oecophorinae
Monotypic moth genera
Moths of South America
Endemic fauna of Chile